Khaparwas Bird Sanctuary is a bird sanctuary in Jhajjar district, about  west of Delhi). The reserve covers 82.70 hectares. 
This is an important part of ecological corridor along the route of Sahibi River which traverses from Aravalli hills in Rajasthan to Yamuna via Masani barrage, Matanhail forest, Chhuchhakwas-Godhari, Khaparwas Wildlife Sanctuary, Bhindawas Wildlife Sanctuary, Outfall Drain Number 8 and 6, Sarbashirpur, Sultanpur National Park, Basai and The Lost Lake (Gurugram). It lies 5 km northwest of Bhindawas Bird Sancturay and 46 km northwest of Sultantpur National Park via road.

The Adjacent villages are Khaparwas, Bhindawas, Chandol, Dhakla and Surehti.

History
The Forests Department, Haryana of Government of Haryana officially declared this to be a Wildlife Sanctuary on 30 January 1987.

Khaparwas Lake 
Rainwater, JLN Feeder Canal and its escape channel are main source of water in the bird sanctuary.

Nearby Attraction
 Bhindawas Wildlife Sanctuary 1.5 km from Khaparwas Wildlife Sanctuary.

See also
 List of National Parks & Wildlife Sanctuaries of Haryana, India
 Haryana Tourism
 List of Monuments of National Importance in Haryana
 List of State Protected Monuments in Haryana
 Sultanpur National Park
 Okhla Sanctuary, bordering Delhi in adjoining Uttar Pradesh
 Nearby Najafgarh drain bird sanctuary, Delhi
 Nearby Najafgarh lake or Najafgarh jheel (Now completely drained by Najafgarh drain)
 National Zoological Park Delhi
 Asola Bhatti Wildlife Sanctuary, Delhi
 Bhalswa horseshoe lake, Delhi

References 

Wildlife sanctuaries in Haryana
Villages in Jhajjar district

Lakes of Haryana
Jhajjar district
Wetlands of India
Protected areas established in 1987
1987 establishments in Haryana